Don't Forget... Lugovaya Station is a 1966 Soviet drama film directed by Nikita Kurikhin and Leonid Menaker.

Plot 
The film takes place during the war. A military train and a train populated by refugees were stuck at the same station. A young lieutenant meets a young girl and spends several days with her. Before parting, they agreed to write to each other at Lugovaya station...

Cast 
 Georgiy Yumatov
 Alla Chernova
 Valentina Vladimirova	
 Valentina Kibardina
 Muza Krepkogorskaya
 O. Balyuv
 V. Batorov
 Oleg Belov
 Igor Bogdanov
 Aleksandr Demyanenko as Student
 Nikolai Korn
 Valery Lysenkov
 Pyotr Merkurev
 Ira Shabunina
 Yevgeniya Uralova
 Yelizaveta Uvarova
 Irina Chipizhenko

References

External links 
 

1966 films
Films directed by Leonid Menaker
1960s Russian-language films
Soviet drama films
1966 drama films